The Imbituva River is a river of Paraná state in southern Brazil.

See also
List of rivers of Paraná

References
Brazilian Ministry of Transport

Rivers of Paraná (state)